Robert Lawrence (November 9, 1913 – September 19, 2004) was a Canadian film editor who was nominated at the 33rd Academy Awards in the category of Best Film Editing for the film Spartacus.

Filmography
Stalag 17 (1953) (assistant editor) (uncredited)
Man of Conflict (1953)
Giant (1956) (uncredited)
Hot Rod Rumble (1957) (associate editor) 
Anna Lucasta (1958) (uncredited)
City of Fear (1959)
Day of the Outlaw (1959)
Tokyo After Dark (1959)
Spartacus (1960)
El Cid (1961)
55 Days at Peking (1963)
A Carol for Another Christmas (1964)
The Fall of the Roman Empire (1964)
Is Paris Burning? (1966)
Buona Sera, Mrs. Campbell (1968) (editorial supervisor) 
Uptight (1968)
Loving (1970)
Promise at Dawn (1970)
Fiddler on the Roof (1971)
Up the Sandbox (1972)
S*P*Y*S (1974)
Whiffs (1975)
I Will, I Will... for Now (1976)
Fingers (1978)
Exposed (1983)
Never Say Never Again (1983) (supervising editor) 
Fort Saganne (1984)
Warning Sign (1985)
8 Million Ways to Die (1986)
Rent-a-Cop (1987)

References

External links

Canadian film editors
People from Montreal
1913 births
2004 deaths
Canadian expatriates in the United States